Indian Air Force FC, also known as Indian Air Force Sports, serves as a football section of Indian Air Force New Delhi. The team regularly participates in Delhi Premier League and Durand Cup. The team is affiliated with Football Delhi (formerly Delhi Soccer Association).

Honours

Association football

FD Senior Division/Delhi Premier League
 Champions (8): 1971, 1975, 1998, 2002, 2003, 2006–07, 2018, 2021
 Runners-up (3): 1997, 2004, 2019
 Durand Cup
 Runners-up (1): 1955
 DCM Trophy
 Champions (1): 1955, 1956
 Lal Bahadur Shastri Cup
 Champions (2): 1983, 2006
 Runners-up (1): 1981
Mohan Kumar Mangalam Football Tournament
 Champions (1): 2005
 Runners-up (1): 2020
Inter Services Football Championship
 Runners-up (1): 2016–17

Field hockey
 Aga Khan Gold Cup
 Runners-up (1): 1958

See also
 Army Red
 Army Green
 Indian Navy
 Services football team
 Indian Army Service Corps

References

Indian Air Force
Air
Organizations with year of establishment missing